The 1927 Tour of Flanders was held in 1927.

General classification

Final general classification

References
Résultats sur siteducyclisme.net
Résultats sur cyclebase.nl

External links
 

Tour of Flanders
1927 in road cycling
1927 in Belgian sport